The 2011 Korean FA Cup, known as the 2011 Hana Bank FA Cup, was the 16th edition of Korean FA Cup. Seongnam Ilhwa Chunma became champions and qualified for the 2012 AFC Champions League.

Schedule

Teams

Qualifying rounds
The first round was held on 12 March 2011 and the second round was held on 10 April 2011.

First round
The draw for the first round was held on 10 February 2011.

Second round
The draw for the second round was held on 12 March 2011.

Final rounds

Bracket

Round of 32
The draw for the round of 32 was held on 25 April 2011.

Round of 16
The draw for the round of 16 was held on 26 May 2011.

Quarter-finals
The draw for the quarter-finals was held on 4 July 2011.

Semi-finals
The draw for the semi-finals was held on 4 August 2011.

Final

Awards

Main awards

Man of the Round

See also
2011 in South Korean football
2011 K League
2011 Korea National League
2011 Challengers League
2011 U-League
2011 Korean League Cup

References

External links
Official website
Fixtures & Results at KFA

2011
2011 in South Korean football
2011 domestic association football cups